Carl Agardh Westerlund (12 January 1831 – 28 February 1908 in Ronneby) was a Swedish malacologist.

Biography
Westerlund was born at Berga in Kalmar County, Sweden.
He became a student in Uppsala University  in 1853 and studied at Lund University where he received his bachelor's degree in 1860 and became a Ph.D. in 1862.

He worked as a temporary teacher in Malmö in 1858–1859 and in Landskrona 1860–1862, and was a teacher at the high school in Ronneby from 1862 to 1893.

Westerlund contributed much to the knowledge of the land and freshwater molluscs of the palearctic region, despite working under unfavourable conditions. His largest work was Fauna der in der paläarctischen Region... lebenden Binnenconchylien in 9 volumes published 1884–1890. He also contributed papers in ornithology and botany.

Works
1865 Sveriges land- och sötvatten-mollusker, beskrifna af Carl Agardh Westerlund Lund, I kommission hos C.W.K. Gleerups sortiment
 Fauna Molluscorum Terrestrium et Fluviatilium Sveciæ, Norvegiæ et Daniæ. Sveriges,Norges och Danmarks land och sötvatten-mollusker. I. Landmolluskerna. Stockholm: Adolf Bonnier. [5] + 296 p.
 1877 Sibiriens land- och sötvatten-mollusker. Kongliga Svenska Vetenskaps-Akademins Handlingar (Ny Följd) 14 (12): 1–111, pl. [1]
 1883.Von der Vega-expedition in Asien gesammelteBinnen mollusken. Nachrichtsblatt der Deutschen Malakozoologischen Gesellschaft 1883 15 (3–4): 48–59
1890 Katalog der in der Paläarctischen Region lebenden Binnenconchylien, von Dr. Carl Agardh Westerlund.  Karlshamn, E.G. Johansson's Buchdruckerei 
1897 Synopsis molluscorum extramarinorum Scandinaviæ (Suecae, Norvegae, Danae & Fennae) Helsingfors :[s.n.]

References

External links
 

1831 births
1908 deaths
People from Kalmar
Lund University alumni
Uppsala University alumni
Swedish malacologists
19th-century Swedish zoologists